Lyces attenuata is a moth of the family Notodontidae first described by James S. Miller in 2009. It is known almost exclusively from material collected by Anton Hermann Fassl in 1907 and 1908 in western Colombia.

External links
Species page at Tree of Life Web Project

Notodontidae
Moths described in 2009